Maria Cecilia Christina Östling (born 17 January 1978) is a former breaststroke swimmer from Sweden, who twice won a gold medal at the European Championships. She competed for her native country at the 1996 Summer Olympics in Atlanta, Georgia, in the women's 100 m breaststroke (23rd place) and the women's 200 m breaststroke (21st place). Östling also participated in the 2004 Summer Olympics, finishing in 17th place in the women's 100 m breaststroke.

Clubs
SS Mora 1991–1996
Södertörns SS 1996–present

References

1978 births
Swimmers at the 1996 Summer Olympics
Swimmers at the 2004 Summer Olympics
Olympic swimmers of Sweden
Medalists at the FINA World Swimming Championships (25 m)
European Aquatics Championships medalists in swimming
People from Gnesta Municipality
Living people
SS Mora swimmers
Södertörns SS swimmers
Swedish female breaststroke swimmers
Sportspeople from Södermanland County
20th-century Swedish women
21st-century Swedish women